Mołstowa is a river of Poland. It is a tributary of Rega river near Bielikowo.

Rivers of Poland
Rivers of West Pomeranian Voivodeship